is a city located in Nara Prefecture, Japan. The city was founded on March 31, 1958. As of September 1, 2014, the city has an estimated population of 27,950 and estimated population density of 440 persons per km². The total area is 60.58 km².

Neighboring municipalities
 Nara Prefecture
 Yamatotakada
 Kashihara
 Gojō
 Katsuragi
 Takatori
 Ōyodo
 Osaka Prefecture
 Chihayaakasaka

Education
 Gose Higashi High School
 Seishou High School
 Gose Technology High School

Transportation

Rail
West Japan Railway Company
Wakayama Line: Gose Station - Tamade Station - Wakigami Station - Yoshinoguchi Station
Kintetsu Railway
Gose Line: Kintetsu Gose Station
Yoshino Line: Kuzu Station - Yoshinoguchi Station
Katsuragisan Ropeway: Katsuragitozanguchi Station - Katsuragisanjyō Station

Roads
Expressways
Keinawa Expressway
Japan National Route 24
Japan National Route 168
Japan National Route 309

Notable locations
 Kamotsuwa Shrine
 Kamoyamaguchi Shrine
 Takakamo Shrine
 Katsuragi Hitokotonushi Shrine
 Mount Yamato-Katsuragi (959.2 m)
 Sankogan, herbal medicine producer founded in 1319
 Gose-machi town

References

External links

Gose City official website 

Cities in Nara Prefecture